In the branch of abstract mathematics called category theory, a projective cover of an object X is in a sense the best approximation of X by a projective object P.  Projective covers are the dual of injective envelopes.

Definition 

If R is a ring, then in the category of R-modules, a superfluous epimorphism is then an epimorphism  such that the kernel of p is a superfluous submodule of P.

Properties
Projective covers and their superfluous epimorphisms, when they exist, are unique up to isomorphism. The isomorphism need not be unique, however, since the projective property is not a full fledged universal property.

The main effect of p having a superfluous kernel is the following: if N is any proper submodule of P, then .  Informally speaking, this shows the superfluous kernel causes P to cover M optimally, that is, no submodule of P would suffice. This does not depend upon the projectivity of P: it is true of all superfluous epimorphisms.

If (P,p) is a projective cover of M, and P'  is another projective module with an epimorphism , then there is a split epimorphism α from P'  to P such that 

Unlike injective envelopes and flat covers, which exist for every left (right) R-module regardless of the ring R, left (right) R-modules do not in general have projective covers.  A ring R is called left (right) perfect if every left (right) R-module has a projective cover in R-Mod (Mod-R).

A ring is called semiperfect if every finitely generated left (right) R-module has a projective cover in R-Mod (Mod-R).  "Semiperfect" is a left-right symmetric property.

A ring is called lift/rad if idempotents lift from R/J to R, where J is the Jacobson radical of R.  The property of being lift/rad can be characterized in terms of projective covers: R is lift/rad if and only if direct summands of the R module R/J (as a right or left module) have projective covers.

Examples 
In the category of R modules:
If M is already a projective module, then the identity map from M to M is a superfluous epimorphism (its kernel being zero).  Hence, projective modules always have projective covers.
If J(R)=0, then a module M has a projective cover if and only if M is already projective.
In the case that a module M is simple, then it is necessarily the top of its projective cover, if it exists.
The injective envelope for a module always exists, however over certain rings modules may not have projective covers.  For example, the natural map from Z onto Z/2Z is not a projective cover of the Z-module Z/2Z (which in fact has no projective cover). The class of rings which provides all of its right modules with projective covers is the class of right perfect rings.
Any R-module M has a flat cover, which is equal to the projective cover if R has a projective cover.

See also
 Projective resolution

References 

Category theory
Homological algebra
Module theory